During the 1992–93 English football season, Reading F.C. competed in the Football League Second Division.
In 1991, following the breakaway of the 22 First Division clubs to form the Premier League, the Football League divisions were renamed. As a result of the re-branding, the Third Division was renamed the Second Division. Reading went on to finish 8th in the league, missing out on the play-offs by 3 points, reached the Third round of the FA Cup and the Second round of both the League Cup and League Trophy.

Squad

Left club during season

Transfers

In

Out

Loans In

Loans Out

Released

Competitions

Division Two

Results

League table

FA Cup

League Cup

Football League Trophy

Squad statistics

Appearances and goals

|-
|colspan="14"|Players who appeared for Reading but left during the season:

|}

Goal Scorers

Team kit
Reading's kit for the 1992–93 was manufactured by Brooks Sports, and the main sponsor was Auto Trader.

Notes

References

Soccerbase.com
Reading team stats at Neil Brown

Reading F.C. seasons
Reading